The Torok Formation is a geologic formation in the National Petroleum Reserve in Alaska (NPR-A). It preserves fossils dating back to the Cretaceous period.

Geology
The Torok Formation together with the Nanushuk Formation forms a huge wedge of sediment deposited in a deep water basin and stretch from north of the Brooks Range beneath the Alaska North Slope to the adjacent offshore. It contains reservoirs in turbidite sandstone.
The USGS found large-scale folds and faults in the South of the formation and evidence, that the rocks have been heated to temperatures at which oil is converted to natural gas.

See also 

 List of fossiliferous stratigraphic units in Alaska
 Paleontology in Alaska

References 

 

Cretaceous Alaska